Andrew Eben Strominger (born 1955) is an American theoretical physicist who is the director of Harvard's Center for the Fundamental Laws of Nature. He has made significant contributions to quantum gravity and string theory. These include his work on Calabi–Yau compactification and topology change in string theory, and on the stringy origin of black hole entropy. He is a senior fellow at the Society of Fellows, and is the Gwill E. York Professor of Physics.

Education 

Strominger received his bachelor's degree at Harvard College in 1977 and his master's degree at the University of California, Berkeley. He then received his PhD at MIT in 1982 under the supervision of Roman Jackiw. Prior to joining Harvard as a professor in 1997, he held a faculty position at the University of California, Santa Barbara. He is the author of over 200 publications.

Research

Notable contributions 

 a paper with Cumrun Vafa that explains the microscopic origin of the black hole entropy, originally calculated thermodynamically by Stephen Hawking and Jacob Bekenstein, from string theory
 a paper with Philip Candelas, Gary Horowitz, and Edward Witten in the 1980s about the relevance of Calabi–Yau manifolds for obtaining the Standard Model from string theory
 other articles discussing the dS/CFT correspondence and the Kerr/CFT correspondence (variations of the AdS/CFT correspondence)
 S-branes (a variation of D-branes)
 OM-theory (with Shiraz Minwalla and Nathan Seiberg)
 noncommutative solitons (with Anastasia Volovich, Shiraz Minwalla and Rajesh Gopakumar)
 massless black holes in the form of wrapped D3-branes that regulate the physics of a conifold and allow topology change
 the SYZ conjecture, an interpretation of mirror symmetry as a special case of T-duality (with Eric Zaslow and Shing-Tung Yau)
 purely cubic action for string field theory
 superstrings with torsion
 a study of the relationship between asymptotic symmetries in asymptotically flat spacetimes, soft theorems and memory effects
 an analytic calculation of the exact spectrum of gravitational wave emission from extreme mass ratio inspirals (EMRIs) into rapidly rotating black holes (these gravitational waves are expected to be detected with future space-based gravitational wave detectors such as eLISA)

Awards 

In recognition of his accomplishments, Strominger has been awarded numerous prizes, fellowships, and honorary professorships. These include the Klein Medal from the Royal Swedish Academy of Sciences, the 2008 Eisenbud Prize from the American Mathematical Society, the 2014 Dirac Medal from the Abdus Salam International Centre for Theoretical Physics, which he received for his contributions to the origin, development, and further understanding of string theory, and the 2017 Fundamental Physics Breakthrough Prize. Furthermore, he received the Physics Frontiers Breakthrough Prize from the Milner Foundation along with colleague Cumrun Vafa in 2014. This award was bestowed upon the pair in honor of their "numerous deep and groundbreaking contributions to quantum field theory, quantum gravity, string theory and geometry." The Foundation also recognized their "joint statistical derivation of the Bekenstein–Hawking area–entropy relation unified the laws of thermodynamics with the laws of black hole dynamics and revealed the holographic nature of quantum spacetime." In 2020, he received a Guggenheim Fellowship.

References

External links 

 Home page of Strominger at Harvard
 Harvard Physics Department Newsletter, fall 2015 describing the Strominger group's research (pp. 21-25)
 Strominger's articles in the INSPIRE-HEP database

1955 births
Living people
21st-century American physicists
Harvard University faculty
Harvard College alumni
Massachusetts Institute of Technology alumni
MIT Center for Theoretical Physics alumni
American string theorists
Members of the United States National Academy of Sciences
MIT Department of Physics alumni
Fellows of the American Physical Society